Mungyeong Jeon clan is one of the Korean clans. Their Bon-gwan is in Mungyeong, North Gyeongsang Province. According to the research held in 2000, the number of Mungyeong Jeon clan’s member was 5535. Their founder was  who worked as Grand Secretariat of Long Tu Court in Yuan dynasty. He entered Goryeo as a fatherly master of Queen Noguk who had a marriage to an ordinary person planned by Gongmin of Goryeo in 1351. He worked as Pingzhangshi and married Choe Yeong’s sister. After that, he was settled in Kaesong and his government post reached to Jeongdang munhak. Then, his descendant founded Mungyeong Jeon clan and made Mungyeong, Mungyeong Jeon clan’s Bon-gwan.

See also 
 Korean clan names of foreign origin

References

External links 
 

 
Korean clan names of Chinese origin
Jeon clans